The Charlottesville Men's Pro Challenger is a professional tennis tournament played on hard courts. It is part of the ATP Challenger Tour and held annually in Charlottesville, Virginia, United States, since 2009.

Past finals

Singles

Doubles

References
Official Website
ITF search

 
ATP Challenger Tour
Hard court tennis tournaments in the United States